Tropane is a nitrogenous bicyclic organic compound. It is mainly known for the other alkaloids derived from it, which include atropine and cocaine, among others. Tropane alkaloids occur in plants of the families Erythroxylaceae (including coca) and Solanaceae (including mandrake, henbane, deadly nightshade, datura, potato, tomato).

Structurally, tropane is cycloheptane with a nitrogen bridge between carbons 1 and 5 and an additional methyl group attached to the nitrogen. While carbons 1 and 5 are asymmetric carbons, tropane itself is optically inactive due to mirror symmetry.

8-Azabicyclo[3.2.1]octane (tropane without the N-methyl group) is known as nortropane or nor-tropane.

See also 

 Phenyltropane
 Tropane alkaloid
 Tropine

References